Giannina e Bernardone is a dramma giocoso in two acts by composer Domenico Cimarosa with an Italian libretto by Filippo Livigni. The opera premiered in the autumn of 1781 at the Teatro San Samuele in Venice. A portion of the work was performed again in 1786 in Venice in the form of an intermezzo entitled Il villano geloso.

Roles

Recording

 1953 - Sena Jurinac (Giannina), Sesto Bruscantini (Bernardone), Graziella Sciutti (Lauretta), Disma de Ceco (Donna Aurora), Mario Carlin (Capitano Francone), Mario Borriello (Don Orlando), Carlo de Antonio (Masino)Coro e Orchestra della RAI di Milano, Nino Sanzogno (conductor) - Andromeda (2 CDs)

References 

1781 operas
Italian-language operas
Drammi giocosi
Operas by Domenico Cimarosa
Operas